Alrashid Bin-Hafeth Kaleematun Sahoubah ( Shuba ) (1827–1912) was a Yemenite rabbi of the 19th and early 20th centuries.  He founded the Jewish/gypsy pseudo-tribe Bani Sahoubah which flourished under Taharid Rule of Central Yemen. Bani Sahoubah was well known as skilled in  the arts, crafts and cosmetics and as influential mystics of Lurianic Kabbalah. Alrashed became the object of much ridicule by the Dor Dai movement in Judaism, which was intended to combat the influence of the Zohar and restore the rational approach of Maimonides and the Jewish law as codified by him.  Alrashed Sahoubah served as sheik in the 19th century and died in 1912. Rabbi Sahoubah has one son that was born in 1879 who was heir to his vast empire. His son Saeed Sohoubah was born in 1879 and died in the 1960s in a small village outside of Rada'. His tribe survives today ruled by his great grandson.  The current Rabbani of the Bani-Sahoubah is Ibrahim Abdo Said Alrashid Sohoubah (Abraham Shubah ) born through a union with a descendant from the tribe of a well-known warrior and chieftain of neighbouring Gharrodha. On the gypsy side the last chieftain of the Zootis is Husan Sharif, a descendant of legendary Zooti Geddi Sharif.

See also 

 Dor Daim and Iqshim

References 

Sahoubah, Riyesah. "A Journey through the forgotten Kingdom." New York, New York. April 7, 1983.

External links 
 Online text of the Milhamot Hashem

Yemenite rabbis
1827 births
1912 deaths